SS Sir Walter Scott is a small steamship that has provided pleasure cruises and a ferry service on Loch Katrine in the scenic Trossachs of Scotland for more than a century, and is the only surviving screw steamer in regular passenger service in Scotland. She is named after the writer Walter Scott, who set his 1810 poem Lady of the Lake, and his 1818 novel Rob Roy around Loch Katrine.

The Trossachs became very popular in the Victorian era, and there were early steamship services on the loch. The Loch is surrounded by wooded mountains, and has romantic historical connections including the birthplace of the outlaw Rob Roy MacGregor. Queen Victoria had a holiday house built overlooking the loch.

William Denny and Brothers built Sir Walter Scott as a "knock-down" ship; that is, the steamer was assembled with bolts and nuts at Denny's shipyard at Dumbarton on the River Leven in 1899, launched and undertook performance trials in the Firth of Clyde, including recording her speed on the measured mile.  She was then dismantled and the numbered pieces were transported by barge up Loch Lomond and overland by horse-drawn cart to Stronachlachar pier on Loch Katrine where the steamer was reassembled with permanent rivets and, in 1900, relaunched. The original cost was £4,269, which included a delivery charge of £2,028.

She is powered by the original three-cylinder triple-expansion steam engine made by Matthew Paul & Company, Dumbarton, and has two locomotive-type boilers which until the end of 2007 were fired by solid fuel fed into the firebox by a stoker. At a time when most steamers changed to oil-fired boilers, Sir Walter Scott kept using solid fuel to meet the requirement of ensuring that Glasgow's water supply was not polluted, changing from coal to coke to reduce air pollution. In a refit at the end of the 2007 season the boilers were altered to run on biofuel. During this refit, the superstructure was rebuilt and a forward deck cabin was added. Some consider the modified superstructure an abomination, destroying the classic lines of this Victorian era steamer. The vessel has a crew of five.

She runs in the morning at 10:30, taking walkers and cyclists who return by land. She then takes those embarking at the pier and those doing the round trip back to Trossachs pier. In the afternoon she also does one or more shorter scenic cruises. Between January and March the ship is taken up on a slipway for maintenance work. A second boat, Lady of the Lake, runs return trips to Stonachlachar in the summer months and also runs between January and March on Wednesdays, Saturdays and Sundays.

See also
List of ships built by William Denny and Brothers
List of oldest surviving ships

References

External links
The Loch Katrine Experience: Steamship Sir Walter Scott (includes sailing times and fares)

1899 ships
Ships built on the River Clyde
Ferries of Scotland
Ships and vessels of the National Historic Fleet
Steamships
Tourist attractions in Stirling (council area)
Trossachs